Faiveley Transport, formerly Faiveley,  is an international manufacturer and supplier of equipment for the railway industry founded in 1919. It introduced the single-arm pantograph in 1955. The company has subsidiaries in more than 24 countries. The majority of Faiveley Transport's outstanding stock is owned by Wabtec, which acquired majority stock ownership from the Faiveley family in 2016.

History

First years
In 1919, Louis Faiveley founded in Saint-Ouen, France, the Établissements Louis Faiveley, a small assembly shop centered on electromechanical parts. It soon grew and became one of the French railway system's leading suppliers. It introduced in 1923 its first pantograph. In 1930, it also ventured into the manufacture of door systems for trains. By the 1930s, it was already one of France's leading companies in all its fields of activity. In 1935, the company became a Société Anonyme, although the shares' majority stayed in hands of the Faiveley family.

After the Second World War, the company quickly recovered and in 1946, it introduced electric heating systems. In 1955, it helped set a new high-speed train record, as a Faiveley-equipped train exceeded 331 kilometres per hour. That year, Faiveley also introduced the first single-arm pantograph. This innovation helped the company to ensure its position as world leader in railway pantograph systems.

Internationalisation
In 1961, the company created a research and development division with the aim of adapting electronic applications to the railroad industry, included automatic door systems. It also begun to equip the new rubber-wheeled Paris Metro cars. In 1965, the company started to produce automatic doors for buildings, creating in 1968 a subsidiary specifically for this area: Faiveley Automatismes.

The company continued its expansion. It opened subsidiaries in Spain and Brazil (Equipfer) in 1966 and 1976, respectively. In 1979, an Italian branch was created. Although initial attempts to enter into the American and Canadian markets were not as successful, by the late 1990s it had expanded into those countries.

The Stone-Faiveley AMBR pantograph is one of the four standard pantographs in use on British railway locomotives and multiple units. It is generally associated with older rolling stock.

France remained as Faiveley's core market. During the 1970s, the company introduced new corail coaches for the SNCF and provided equipment for a new generation of subway trains, the MF77. In 1972, Faiveley presented its first very-high-speed pantograph. Soon after, it introduced its first electric automated road system.

In 1984, Faiveley purchased Saint-Gobain subsidiary Air-Industrie's transport division, giving it operations in passenger train air conditioning systems. That year, it acquired from the Matra's subsidiary Interlec its tachometry activities. Together with the company's other transportation-related activities, these subsidiary operations were gathered into a newly created subsidiary: Faiveley Transport.

The company was one of the suppliers of the new SNCF's TGV trains. In 1990, its pantographs were key to achieve a new 513.3 kilometres per hour record by TGV Atlantique.

In 1991, the company moved its headquarters to Saint-Pierre-des-Corps.

Diversification

With competition becoming more intense in its field of activity, Faiveley decided it was time to expand their operations.

In 1992, the company acquired plastics product maker Grand-Perret. In 1993, Faiveley moved to concentrate its activities around its historic core of railroad and transportation equipment and its brand new plastics division, selling its Faiveley Automatismes subsidiary. It also made an aggressive move to increase its business in the Japanese market, one of the most important at the time, forming a joint venture with Nabco called Nabco-Faiveley Ltd which became one of leading providers of Japan's railroad. Later, Faiveley partnered also with Mitsui. That year Faiveley created a British subsidiary, to take a part of the business in the recently privatised rail system.

In 1994, Faiveley was listed on the Paris Bourse. In 1995, it acquired VPI-Verchère Plastiques Industriels, a thermo-injected plastic company. The following year, Faiveley added the operations of Rhône Moulage and Sepal Ltd, two companies also centered in plastics. By the end of the decade, that material had risen to nearly 20 percent of Faiveley's total sales.

In 1995. Faiveley purchased the German railroad air conditioning company Hagenuk Fahrzeugklima from its parent company Siemens. The purchase was a key step into the German market as well as the Asian through its Chinese subsidiary Shanghai Hagenuk Refrigerating Machine, but also brought losses to the company during the following years. This led to a reorganisation that included staff reductions in Germany and France and changes in the board of directors.

In December 2002, Faiveley purchased a 75 percent stake in the Czech pantograph and electro-mechanical equipment supplier Lekov. In 2004, it acquired the train brakes manufacturer Sab Wabco and the air conditioning manufacturer Neu Systèmes. In early 2007, it purchased the electronic systems and rolling stock manufacturer ESPAS group. Faiveley CX pantographs were fitted in the V150 TGV's record-breaking attempt of 2007, which set a new world railway speed record of 574.8 kilometres per hour.

In April 2008, the company acquired from Carbone Lorraine its sintered brake material manufacturing and design department.  In July of that year, it purchased the American freight wagon components' manufacturer Ellcon-National.

In September 2009 Faiveley SA and its subsidiary Faiveley Transport merged into a sole company, called Faiveley Transport SA.

In March 2011, the company purchased an 80 percent stake in the rolling stock heating, ventilation and air conditioning equipment manufacturer Urs Dolder AG and the remaining stake of Lekov.

On 3 February 2012, Faiveley Transport completed the purchase of Graham-White, an American designer and manufacturer of compressed air drying and brake systems for rail transport.

In February 2013, the company won a trial against Wabtec for the acts of unfair competition and secrets violation.

On 30 November 2016, the 51% stake of the company controlled by the Faiveley family was purchased by Wabtec, giving Wabtec controlling interest in Faiveley Transport.

Current activities

Faiveley Transport offers a wide range of products related to the train equipment, such as cabin heating, ventilation and air conditioning (HVAC); HVAC system room, air distribution ducts, exhaust, urs dolder heaters; pantographs and high voltage switches, energy meters, auxiliary power converters, master controllers and driver awareness system. The company also provides access and information systems, such as platform screen doors and automatic platform gates, portal platform, door systems, passenger information systems and CCTV vigilance. In addition, it provides checks and security products, including couplers, odometry/tachometry systems and event recorders, brake control units, oil-free air generator BURAN, Nowe sanding, axle mounted disc, magnetictrack brake, disc brakes controllers, air generation and air treatment, and pantograph compressor. The company provides renovation, maintenance, installation and consultancy services, including torque and engineering maintenance and spare parts and logistics. It serves tram, metro, high speed locomotives, and regional market segments trains.

Acquisition by Wabtec
In December 2016, Wabtec acquired majority stock ownership of Faiveley Transport from the Faiveley family, who had owned about 51% of the outstanding shares, for €1.6 billion and 6.3 million shares of Wabtec's common stock. After tender offers for the remaining outstanding shares, Wabtec owned 98.53% of Faiveley stock, with 97.66% of the voting rights. Wabtec plans to complete the acquisition with a mandatory squeeze-out of the shares which were not tendered.

See also
 Stone Faiveley AMBR Pantograph

References

Sources

Manufacturing companies established in 1919
Companies based in Paris
Rail technologies
Manufacturing companies of France
Wabtec
2017 mergers and acquisitions
Corporate subsidiaries
French brands
French companies established in 1919